Jean-Sébastien Dominique Francois Jacques (born October 1971) is a former chief executive officer of Rio Tinto Group. He succeeded Sam Walsh in July 2016. He was succeeded by Jakob Stausholm in early 2021.

He resigned as CEO in 2020 following a week of international controversy over Rio Tinto's legal destruction of Juukan Gorge, a priceless Australian Aboriginal sacred site which had evidence of 46,000 years of continual human occupation.

Jacques had been named by the Harvard Business Review as one of the world's best chief executives prior to his departure of Rio Tinto in 2020.

Early life
Jacques was born in France in October 1971. He attended the Lycée Louis-le-Grand in Paris before studying engineering at École Centrale Paris.

Career
Prior to Rio Tinto, Jacques was group strategy director for Tata Steel.

Jacques joined Rio Tinto in 2011, and became head of copper and coal businesses.
Jacques became deputy CEO in March 2016, and CEO in July 2016.

During his tenure, Jacques set an ambition for Rio Tinto Group to become net carbon neutral by 2050 underpinned by a commitment to invest around $1 billion between 2020 and 2025. 
He entered into a series of partnerships with several customers and partners to address climate change and environmental challenges: with Apple and Alcoa to develop new aluminium technologies (2018), with China Baowu Steel Group, the largest steel maker in China and Tsinghua University(2019)., and with Nippon steel, the largest steel maker in Japan (2020). He exited all Rio Tinto Group coal assets between 2016 and 2018, ahead of the industry.

Jacques took accountability for the legal destruction of a sacred Australian Aboriginal site at Juukan Gorge despite the fact that the decision to blast the cave was made before he became CEO. The 46,000-year-old sacred Aboriginal site was destroyed with explosives in May 2020. In front of the commission of enquiry Jacques said that in 2013 the group had three other options to develop its mine without damaging the sacred site. "The difference between the fourth option and the other three options was eight million tonnes of high-grade iron ore" (82 million euros). The fourth option was chosen to blast the cave and a section 18 (authorisation to disturb the site) was granted in 2013 under the previous CEO, Sam Walsh.

Upon his resignation, Rio Tinto's chairman Simon Thompson stated that “What happened at Juukan was wrong and we are determined to ensure that the destruction of a heritage site of such exceptional archaeological and cultural significance never occurs again at a Rio Tinto operation. . . . I would like to thank J-S for his strong leadership of the Group since becoming Chief Executive in 2016. During that time, he has led the best safety performance in Rio Tinto’s history, simplified the portfolio, divested the Group’s coal assets, established a clear strategy to address climate change and generated exceptional shareholder returns. His leadership during the COVID-19 pandemic, in particular, has been exemplary".

Jacques was the chairman of the International Copper Association from 2014 to 2016. 
He is a board member of the International Council on Mining and Metals (ICMM) since 2016.

He is a member of the Global CEO Council (GCC) of the Chinese People's Association for Friendship with Foreign Countries, and a member of the Business Council in the USA. He was a board member of the Business Council of Australia from November 2019 until his resignation in September 2020.

In 2019 Jacques was named by Harvard Business Review as one of the world's 100 best chief executives.

Personal life
He is married, with children.

References

1971 births
Living people
Tata Steel people
Lycée Louis-le-Grand alumni
École Centrale Paris alumni
French chief executives
People of Rio Tinto (corporation)